Alphonsa may refer to:
 Saint Alphonsa
 Alphonsa (actress)
 Alphonsa (film)
 Alphonsa College, Palai
 Alphonsa College Thiruvambady
 Alphonsa Matriculation Higher Secondary School, Nagercoil